David Bowie (1947–2016) was an English singer-songwriter who recorded over 400 different songs in a career which spanned six decades. Bowie worked with numerous artists throughout his career, including producers Tony Visconti, Brian Eno and singer Iggy Pop, and was the primary songwriter for most of his songs; he recorded cover versions of songs by artists including the Who, the Pretty Things and the Yardbirds. Beginning his career under the name Davy Jones, Bowie released singles with multiple backing bands, including the King Bees and the Lower Third, all of which went generally unnoticed. Following his baroque pop and music hall-influenced self-titled debut album in 1967, he released his first successful single "Space Oddity", which introduced the fictional astronaut Major Tom. He then released his folk rock-inspired second self-titled album in 1969, the hard rock The Man Who Sold the World (1970) and the art pop Hunky Dory (1971), which represented an artistic breakthrough for Bowie, containing songs such as "Changes" and "Life on Mars?".

Between 1972 and 1974, Bowie was a pioneer of the glam rock genre, as showcased on The Rise and Fall of Ziggy Stardust and the Spiders from Mars (1972), which launched Bowie to stardom, Aladdin Sane and the covers album Pin Ups (both 1973), and Diamond Dogs (1974). His songs from this era include "Suffragette City", "The Jean Genie", "Rebel Rebel" and "All the Young Dudes" (made famous by Mott the Hoople), the last two of which are regarded as glam anthems. Young Americans (1975) showcased Bowie's interest in soul and R&B music, as well as funk ("Fame"). Station to Station (1976) was the vehicle for his persona the Thin White Duke, and is commonly known as the musical transition between Young Americans and his experimental art rock Berlin Trilogy, consisting of Low (1977), "Heroes" (1977) and Lodger (1979). Working with Eno and Visconti, Low featured songs influenced by electronic and ambient music, "Heroes" expanding upon Low with a more art pop sound (prominently on its well-known title track), and Lodger marking the partial return to his previous drum and guitar-based rock sound, with elements of new wave and world music present. Scary Monsters (and Super Creeps) (1980) was a culmination of his 1970s works and featured the singles "Ashes to Ashes" and "Fashion". Bowie then recorded "Under Pressure" with Queen and the title track for the 1982 film Cat People with Giorgio Moroder.

Bowie reached his commercial peak with the post-disco and dance-oriented Let's Dance in 1983. Tonight followed a year later, after which Bowie contributed to various film soundtracks and released the pop rock Never Let Me Down (1987). In 1988, Bowie briefly halted his solo career to record with the band Tin Machine, who explored alternative and grunge styles before the genres were particularly well-known; the band dissolved in 1992 and Bowie resumed his solo career. Black Tie White Noise (1993) marked a creative resurgence for Bowie, featuring songs influenced by soul and jazz music, and made prominent use of electronic instruments. After releasing the experimental The Buddha of Suburbia later the same year, Bowie experimented with industrial rock on Outside (1995), drum and bass and jungle on Earthling (1997), and ended the 1990s with the pop rock-oriented Hours (1999). Bowie reunited with Visconti for the rest of his career, releasing the rock albums Heathen (2002) and Reality (2003) before taking a break from music. His final releases were the art rock-oriented The Next Day in 2013, the song "Sue (Or in a Season of Crime)" in 2014, and his final album Blackstar in 2016, before his death of liver cancer two days after its release. The art rock and jazz album was Bowie's intended swan song, featuring several lyrics that revolved around his impending death. Three new songs from the Blackstar sessions were released on the EP No Plan in 2017. Bowie's unreleased 2001 album Toy was posthumously released in 2021.

Songs

Notes

References

Sources

 
Bowie, David